Zabrus aetolus is a species of ground beetle in the Pterostichinae subfamily that is endemic to Greece.

Subspecies
There are eight subspecies of Z. aetolus:
 Z. aetolus aetolus Schaum, 1864
 Z. aetolus borisi Breit, 1936
 Z. aetolus erymanthius Ganglbauer, 1915
 Z. aetolus kodymi Maran, 1940
 Z. aetolus matejkai Maran, 1940
 Z. aetolus ossensis Maran, 1940
 Z. aetolus purkeynei Maran, 1940
 Z. aetolus winkleri J. Müller, 1946

References

Beetles described in 1864
Beetles of Europe
Endemic fauna of Greece
Zabrus
Taxa named by Hermann Rudolph Schaum